Mount Tidbinbilla is a hill in the Australian Capital Territory, Australia. It is located in the Tidbinbilla Nature Reserve.

References

Mountains of the Australian Capital Territory